Obudehalis (also Romanized as Obūdehālīs; also known as Abū Dahālīs) is a village in Chah Salem Rural District, in the Central District of Omidiyeh County, Khuzestan Province, Iran. At the 2006 census, its population was 190, in 38 families.

References 

Populated places in Omidiyeh County